Mount Ghiuselev is the ice-covered mountain of elevation 1082 m in Avroleva Heights on Brabant Island in the Palmer Archipelago, Antarctica.  It has steep and partly ice-free north and northwest slopes, and surmounts Mitev Glacier to the northwest, Pampa Passage to the southeast and Svetovrachene Glacier to the southwest.

The mountain is named after the Bulgarian opera singer Nicola Ghiuselev (1936-2014).

Location
British mapping in 1980 and 2008.

Maps
 Antarctic Digital Database (ADD). Scale 1:250000 topographic map of Antarctica. Scientific Committee on Antarctic Research (SCAR). Since 1993, regularly upgraded and updated.
British Antarctic Territory. Scale 1:200000 topographic map. DOS 610 Series, Sheet W 64 62. Directorate of Overseas Surveys, Tolworth, UK, 1980.
Brabant Island to Argentine Islands. Scale 1:250000 topographic map. British Antarctic Survey, 2008.

Notes

References
 Bulgarian Antarctic Gazetteer. Antarctic Place-names Commission. (details in Bulgarian, basic data in English)
 Mount Ghiuselev. SCAR Composite Antarctic Gazetteer.

External links
 Mount Ghiuselev. Copernix satellite image

Mountains of the Palmer Archipelago
Bulgaria and the Antarctic